Silje Bjelkevik (born 18 April 1981) is a Norwegian former long track speed skater, who was active between 1996 and 2008.

As a junior she won already several medals at national championships. At elite level, she had between 2000 and 2004 a total of 19 starts at national championships. At the 2002 Norwegian Allround Championships she won the bronze medal. The next season she won the silver medal at the 2003 Norwegian Sprint Championships and bronze medal at the 2003 Norwegian Single Distance Championships in the 1500 metres. She also competed at other international competitions.

She is the younger sister of Olympic speed skaters Annette Bjelkevik and twin-sister of Hedvig Bjelkevik. And at the 2003 Norwegian Single Distance Championships in the 1500 metres they crowded the podium with Annette being the champion and Hedvig taking care of the silver medal and Silje of that bronze medal, which was the first time three siblings took care of all the medals in the same Norwegian speed skating championship event.

Records

Personal records

References

External links
Newspaper articles of Bjelkevik via the National Library of Norway

Living people
1981 births
Norwegian female speed skaters
Norwegian twins
People from Arendal
Sportspeople from Agder